Flaminio del Turco (active 1581 till death in 1634) was an Italian architect and sculptor. He was born and active mainly in Siena, Italy. Along with Damiano Schifardini, he helped erect the Collegiata di Provenzano. He also helped the design the church of Santa Lucia, Montepulciano. He completed some altars for the Sienese churches of San Raimondo and San Giovannino della Staffa.

References

16th-century Italian architects
17th-century Italian architects
16th-century Italian sculptors
17th-century Italian sculptors
Italian male sculptors

Architects from Tuscany
16th-century births
Year of birth unknown
1634 deaths